Fort Worth Country Day (FWCD) is a JK-12 private, independent, coeducational, nondenominational college-preparatory school located on approximately 100 acres in Fort Worth, Texas, United States. It is accredited by the Independent Schools Association of the Southwest (ISAS). ISAS is a member of the International Council Advancing Independent School Accreditation (ICAISA).

The school broke ground in 1963 and opened nine months later on September 9, 1963, with grades one through nine. 210 students were initially enrolled. The Sid Richardson Gymnasium opened in 1967. Eight additional buildings and annexes opened in the 1970s and early 1980s. In the 1990s three buildings were built. In 2008, the Fischer Dining Pavilion opened. In 2016, the Patton Field House opened as a replacement for old locker and weight rooms in the gyms.

Mission and values
Fort Worth Country Day School's mission statement is to foster the intellectual, physical, emotional, and ethical development of capable students through an academically rigorous college preparatory program that integrates the arts and athletics. Their purpose is to inspire the passion to learn, the courage to lead and the commitment to serve. The school teaches their six core values which are integrity, kindness, courage, respect, responsibility, and scholarship. The school also values inclusivity.

The 3 A's
Fort Worth Country Day School likes to teach and emphasize the three As: academics, arts, and athletics. Throughout their time at the school, students are involved in all three of these disciplines.

Notable alumni
 Shree Bose, scientist
 Bill Curtis, software engineer
 Pete Geren, former United States Secretary of the Army
 Harriet Sansom Harris, actress
 Patrick Jeffers, former NFL player
 Emily Lakdawalla, Senior Editor of The Planetary Society
 J. Mack Slaughter, Jr., actor
 Taylor Smith, member of the 2017 US National Women's Soccer Team
 Carlson Young, actress on MTV's Scream

References

External links

 Fort Worth Country Day

Independent Schools Association of the Southwest
Private schools in Fort Worth, Texas
High schools in Tarrant County, Texas
Private K-12 schools in Texas
1963 establishments in Texas
Educational institutions established in 1963